The Richmond War Memorial is located in front of Whittaker Avenue, between the Old Town Hall and the Riverside in Richmond, London. It marks the deaths of local individuals who died fighting in World War I and World War II. The memorial was designed by the local architects Messrs Goodale and Co of Richmond and was unveiled by Field Marshal Sir William Robertson on 23 November 1921. The Mayor of Richmond and the corporation attended the ceremony.

The memorial has been Grade II listed on the National Heritage List for England since 2017.

It is in the form of a column with an orb on top, standing on a double plinth. On the north side is the statue of a sailor, on the south side the statue of a soldier, and on the east and west sides are the coat of arms of the former Municipal Borough of Richmond, accompanied by this quotation:

On the west side there is a further inscription:

The names of the war dead are engraved into walls that jut out from the memorial. The walls of names were added to the memorial after a newspaper campaign in 1989. The head of the sailor was cut off by vandals in 2003.

External links
 Richmond War Memorial Roll of Honour

References

1921 establishments in England
1921 in London
1921 sculptures
Buildings and structures completed in 1922
Grade II listed buildings in the London Borough of Richmond upon Thames
Grade II listed monuments and memorials
Military memorials in London
Richmond, London
World War I memorials in England
World War II memorials in England